132 Tauri is a binary star system in the constellation Taurus. It is faintly visible to the naked eye with an apparent visual magnitude of 4.89. The system is moving further away with a heliocentric radial velocity of +16 km/s. It lies near the ecliptic and thus is subject to occultation by the Moon. One such event was observed September 3, 1991.

This system forms a wide double star with an angular separation of  along a position angle of 230°, as of 1991. The brighter star, component A, has an apparent magnitude of 4.99 while the fainter secondary, component B, is of magnitude 9.09. The primary is itself an unresolved binary with a combined stellar classification of G9 III, which matches an aging G-type giant star that has exhausted the hydrogen at its core and evolved away from the main sequence.

References

G-type giants
Suspected variables
Taurus (constellation)
Durchmusterung objects
Tauri, 132
038751
027468
2002